Formin-like protein 1 is a protein that in humans is encoded by the FMNL1 gene.

This gene encodes a formin-related protein. Formin-related proteins have been implicated in morphogenesis, cytokinesis, and cell polarity. An alternative splice variant has been described but its full length sequence has not been determined.

Interactions
FMNL1 has been shown to interact with Profilin 1, PFN2 and RAC1.

See also 
 FMNL2
 FMNL3

References

Further reading